The 2002 Worcester City Council election took place on 2 May 2002 to elect members of Worcester City Council in Worcestershire, England. One third of the council was up for election and the council stayed under no overall control.

After the election, the composition of the council was:
Conservative 18
Labour 12
Independent 5
Liberal Democrat 1

Campaign
Before the election no party had a majority, but the Conservatives provided the leader of the council after gaining 5 seats in the 2000 election. Both the Conservatives and Labour had 15 seats, along with 5 independents and 1 Liberal Democrat. The election saw 12 seats being contested with Labour defending 7, the Conservatives 3 and the Liberal Democrats and independents 1 each. Labour only contested 11 of the seats after their candidate in Claines ward was dropped by the party over a letter he wrote to the local paper.

Election result
The results saw Worcester remain a hung council but with the Conservatives becoming clearly the largest party. They gained 3 seats from Labour in All Saints, St Clement and St Martin wards.

Ward results

References

2002
2002 English local elections
2000s in Worcestershire